Five-A-Side is the debut album by the pop rock band Ace, released by Anchor Records in 1974.

The album landed on the Billboard 200 chart, reaching #11 in 1974.

The single "How Long" reached #3 on the Billboard Hot 100 in the spring of 1975.  The song also reached #24 on the Adult Contemporary chart, #3 on the Canadian Singles Chart, and #20 on the UK Singles Chart on 9 November 1974.  The song "Rock & Roll Runaway" peaked at #71 on the Billboard Hot 100 in 1975.

The album was recorded at Rockfield Studios near Monmouth in Wales and at Trident Studios in London, England.  It was produced by John Anthony.

Track listing 
All songs written by Paul Carrack, except where noted.
 "Sniffin' About" (Carrack, Alan King) - 4:44
 "Rock & Roll Runaway" (Carrack, Terry Comer, Phil Harris, King) - 3:08
 "How Long" - 3:21
 "The Real Feeling" - 2:23
 "24 Hours" - 4:00
 "Why?" - 3:43
 "Time Ain't Long" (Carrack, Jes Walker) - 3:53
 "Know How It Feels" - 3:27
 "Satellite" - 3:00
 "So Sorry Baby" (Harris) - 3:54

Personnel
Phil Harris - lead guitar, vocals
Alan "Bam" King - rhythm guitar, vocals
Paul Carrack - organ, vocals, piano, electric piano
Terry "Tex" Comer - bass
Fran Byrne - drums, percussion 
Additional Personnel
 Chris Hughes - horns (5, 9)
 Bud Beadle - horns (5)
 Mick Eves - horns (5)
Technical
Dennis Mackay, John Anthony, Mike Stone, Pat Anthony, Pat Moran - engineers
Neil Kernon, Peter Fielder - tape ops

Chart history
Album

Singles

References

1974 debut albums
Ace (band) albums
Albums produced by John Anthony (record producer)
Albums recorded at Trident Studios
Albums recorded at Rockfield Studios